Yours to Keep, the debut solo album by The Strokes guitarist Albert Hammond Jr, was released October 9, 2006 in the UK through Rough Trade Records and was released in North America on March 6, 2007 through New Line Records/Scratchie Records. The first single taken from it, "Everyone Gets a Star", was released as download only, and the first full single is "Back to the 101". The album also featured help from Sean Lennon, with whom Albert had attended school at Institut Le Rosey. The album title references the eponymous track from the Guided by voices' album Bee Thousand, with the album also including a cover of their song Postal Blowfish as a bonus track.

Track listing
 "Cartoon Music for Superheroes" - 2:04
 "In Transit" - 3:33
 "Everyone Gets a Star" - 3:05
 "Bright Young Thing" - 3:13
 "Blue Skies" - 3:17
 "Back to the 101" ("101" on the U.S. release) - 3:27
 "Call an Ambulance" - 3:11
 "Scared" - 4:42
 "Holiday" - 3:08
 "Hard to Live (In the City)" ("Hard To Live In The City" in the U.S.) - 5:23
 "Postal Blowfish" (U.S. and Canadian bonus track) - 2:20
 "Well...All Right" (U.S. and Canadian bonus track) - 2:27
 "101" [Enhanced CD Music Video] (U.S. and Canadian bonus track)

Chart performance

Personnel

The band
 Albert Hammond Jr. – vocals, lead guitar, drums on "Blue Skies"
 Mikki James – bass guitar, piano, melodica on "Cartoon Music For Superheroes"
 Greg Lattimer – bass guitar, background vocals on "Scared" and bells on "Blue Skies"
 Sean Lennon – piano, background vocals and bass guitar on "In Transit" and background vocals on "Scared"
 Josh Lattanzi – bass guitar and rhythm guitar on "In Transit"
 Matt Romano – drums
 Julian Casablancas – bass guitar and background vocals on "Scared"
 Chris Feinstein – bass guitar on "Scared"
 Roger Greenawalt – ukulele on "Call an Ambulance"
 Greg Glassman – trumpet on "Hard To Live In The City"
 Evan Robinson – trombone on "Hard To Live In The City"
 Alex Levy – shakers on "Hard To Live In The City"

Technical staff
 Greg Lattimer – producer
 Gus Oberg – engineer

References

2006 debut albums
New Line Records albums
Albert Hammond Jr. albums